Jalapa is a city in Guatemala. It is the capital of the department of Jalapa; it is also the municipal seat of that department's municipality of Jalapa.

However, there is a shorter road from Guatemala City to Jalapa using Atlantic Highway and then going south (exit toward the city of Sanarate).

Population 
As of 1850, the population of Jalapa was approximately 3,500.
As of the 2018 census, the town's population reached 159,840.

Religion 
Its cathedral Nuestra Señora de la Expectación is the episcopal see of the Roman Catholic Diocese of Jalapa (Guatemala).

Climate 
The city of Jalapa was built in a valley, surrounded by the Jumay volcano and the mountains of Alcoba and Arluta and the Jalapa Mountains. For this reason and its altitude, 1,362 meters above sea level, the weather is mild temperate; it is never too cold and never too hot.

Economy 
The local economy is based on agricultural and livestock products. The department of Jalapa produces corn and beans which are the main diet of Guatemalans, but also produces fruits such as peaches, apples, blackberries, bananas, avocados and vegetables such as cabbage, lettuce, broccoli and cauliflower, most of which are exported to El Salvador. Jalapa also produces dairy products and is famous for its cheese, especially queso seco ("dry cheese", a drier version of queso fresco) and mantequilla de costal  ("sack butter"), which is produced mainly in Monjas, San Manuel Chaparrón, San Carlos Alzatate and Jalapa.

References 

Municipalities of the Jalapa Department